The Tigress is a 1922 German silent film directed by . The film's art direction was by Franz Schroedter.

Cast
In alphabetical order

References

Bibliography

External links

1922 films
Films of the Weimar Republic
Films directed by Ernst Wendt
German silent feature films
Circus films
German black-and-white films
Terra Film films